Otto Virtanen (born 21 June 2001) is a Finnish tennis player.

Virtanen has a career high ATP singles ranking of 169 achieved on 27 February 2023. He also has a career high ATP doubles ranking of 270 achieved on 31 October 2022. He is currently the No. 2 Finnish singles tennis player. 

Virtanen won the Boys' Doubles title in the Wimbledon Championships in 2018. In December 2018 Virtanen won singles tournament in Orange Bowl.

He won his first Challenger title at the 2022 Trofeo Faip–Perrel and reached the top 200 on 7 November 2022 at world No. 195.

Personal life
Virtanen appeared in two videos on the Finland-based YouTube channel Pongfinity, one titled "Tennis Trick Shots" in July 2019, and another titled "Return a Pro Tennis Serve, Win $1000" in June 2022. Unsurprisingly, no member of the general public was able to return his serve, which resulted in Virtanen winning the $1000 prize.

Junior Grand Slam titles

Doubles: 1 (1 title)

ATP Challenger and ITF Futures/World Tennis Tour finals

Singles: 11 (5–6)

Doubles: 4 (2–2)

References

External links
 
 

2001 births
Living people
Finnish male tennis players
Wimbledon junior champions
Grand Slam (tennis) champions in boys' doubles
People from Hyvinkää
Sportspeople from Uusimaa
21st-century Finnish people